The Plaza de la Diversidad Sexual (Plaza of Sexual Diversity) is located in the Old City neighborhood of Montevideo.  The plaza includes a large triangular granite monolith -- a reference to the pink triangles worn during the Nazi persecution of LGBT people.

History 
Eight activist groups worked together to propose the creation of this plaza: Grupo Diversidad, Grupo LGTTBI, Amnesty International Uruguay, LGTTBI Library, Uruguayan Center for Interdisciplinary Research and Study in Sexuality (CIEI-SU), the Sisters of Perpetual Indulgence, Encuentro Ecuménico por la Liberación de las Minorías Sexuales and the Association of Uruguayan Lesbians.  The proposal received the unanimous support of the Montevideo legislature.

Mariano Arana dedicated the monument on February 2, 2004.

Monolith 
The monolith features the following inscription: "Honrar la diversidad es honrar la vida: Montevideo por el respeto a todo género, identidad y orientación sexual" (Honoring diversity is honoring life: Montevideo for the respect of every gender, identity, and sexual orientation).

See also
 List of LGBT monuments and memorials

References 

Monuments and memorials in Montevideo
LGBT in Uruguay
LGBT monuments and memorials